Walo may refer to:
 Walo (rodent)
 Waalo, an empire of Senegal and Mauritania between the 13th and 19th centuries
 WALO, a radio station of Puerto Rico, US
 Walo language, spoken in Mali
 Prix Walo, an award in Swiss show business

People with the name 
 Walo Hörning (1910–1986), Swiss fencer
 Walo Lüönd (1927–2012), Swiss movie actor

See also
 Wala (disambiguation)